WNJO may refer to:

 WNJO (FM), a radio station (90.3 FM) licensed to Toms River, New Jersey, United States
 WNJO (defunct), a defunct radio station (94.5 FM) located in Trenton, New Jersey, United States